Israel competed at the 2022 World Athletics Championships in Eugene, United States, from 15 to 24 July 2022. The Israeli Athletic Association entered 10 athletes.

On 18 July 2022, Kenyan-born Israeli runner Lonah Chemtai Salpeter won the bronze medal in the women's marathon to give Israel its four medal in the overall history of the World Athletics Championships.

Medalists

Team
The Israeli team consisted of 10 athletes (6 women and 4 men), the second largest number of Israeli athletes that ever went the World Athletics Championships, just behind Seville 1999 when Israel qualified 11 athletes.

Results
Israel entered 10 athletes.

Men
Track events

Field events

Women
Track and road events

Field events

References

External links
Oregon22｜WCH 22｜World Athletics

Nations at the 2022 World Athletics Championships
Israel at the World Championships in Athletics
2022 in Israeli sport